Fall Down is a song written and recorded by the American rock band Tantric. The song was originally recorded for the shelved "Tantric III" album, but due to leaving Maverick Records in 2006 the band released the song on their official Myspace page in May 2007 featuring a guest verse by the American country-rap group Nappy Roots, due to the band leaving their label and the original lineup collapsing the song remained unreleased. In November 2008 due to demanding popularity by fans the band re-recorded the song for a deluxe version of their album The End Begins but without the verse from Nappy Roots. The song was officially released as the third and final single from The End Begins on November 8, 2008.

Charts

2008 singles
Tantric (band) songs
2008 songs
Songs written by Hugo Ferreira